Ricky Legere (born December 21, 1985) is an American professional mixed martial artist currently competing in the Welterweight division. A professional competitor since 2007, Legere has formerly competed for Bellator MMA, Strikeforce, the RFA, King of the Cage, Tachi Palace Fights,

Background
Legere is from Norco, California, attending Norco High School where he was a three-sport athlete and a cif wrestling placer.

Mixed martial arts career

King of the Cage
Legere made his professional mixed martial arts debut in 2007 for King of the Cage. He would go on to win his first six professional fights, with the first four ending in the first round, before facing future Strikeforce and Bellator veteran Waachiim Spiritwolf. Legere was handed his first professional loss at the hands of Spiritwolf, losing via knockout in the second round.

Legere  then faced future King of the Cage Welterweight Champion, as well as future Strikeforce and UFC veteran, Quinn Mulhern. Legere was handed his second consecutive loss via triangle-choke submission in the second round. After bouncing back with two consecutive knockout wins, Legere fought Waachiim Spiritwolf in a rematch for the newly vacated King of the Cage Junior Welterweight Championship. Legere won via TKO in the second round and then defended his title three months later before losing it to future Strikeforce and UFC veteran, Bobby Green.

After another loss at the hands of WEC and Strikeforce veteran Adam Lynn, Legere won his next three fights all in the first round, before being signed by Strikeforce.

Strikeforce
Legere made his Strikeforce debut at Strikeforce: Rockhold vs. Jardine on January 7, 2012, facing off against future UFC fighter Chris Spang. Legere won the bout via unanimous decision.

Bellator
After his first and only fight with Strikeforce, Legere won another bout before being signed by the Bellator Fighting Championships, making his debut for the organization at Bellator 92, facing former Strikeforce fighter Sabah Homasi. Legere won the bout via rear-naked choke submission at 2:52 of the second round.

After the win over Homasi in Bellator, Legere has gone 3–2.

Mixed martial arts record

|-
| Loss
|align=center| 19–7
| J.J. Ambrose
| Submission (guillotine choke)
| KOTC: Bitter Rivals
| 
|align=center| 1
|align=center| 1:36
|Ontario, California, United States
|
|-
| Loss
|align=center| 19–6
| Max Griffin
| KO (punch)
| TPF 21: All or Nothing
| 
|align=center| 1
|align=center| 3:21
|Lemoore, California, United States
|
|-
| Win
|align=center| 19–5
| Nate Loughran
| Submission (rear-naked choke)
| TPF 20: Night of Champions
| 
|align=center| 3
|align=center| 2:51
|Lemoore, California, United States
|
|-
| Loss
|align=center| 18–5
| Alan Jouban
| Decision (split)
| RFA 15: Casey vs. Sanchez
| 
|align=center| 3
|align=center| 5:00
|Culver City, California, United States
|
|-
| Win
|align=center| 18–4
| Joey Cabezas
| Submission (armbar)
| TPF 16: Martinez vs. Giagos
| 
|align=center|1
|align=center|2:22
|Lemoore, California, United States
|
|-
| Win
|align=center| 17–4
| James Chaney
| TKO (punches)
| Flawless FC 3: California Love
| 
|align=center|3
|align=center|1:00
|Inglewood, California, United States
|
|-
| Win
|align=center| 16–4
| Sabah Homasi
| Submission (rear-naked choke)
| Bellator 92
| 
|align=center|2
|align=center|2:52
|Temecula, California, United States
|
|-
| Win
|align=center| 15–4
| Steve Van Vilet
| Submission (rear-naked choke)
| Gladiator Challenge: Heat Returns
| 
|align=center|1
|align=center|0:45
|San Jacinto, California, United States
|
|-
| Win
|align=center| 14–4
| Chris Spang
| Decision (unanimous)
| Strikeforce: Rockhold vs. Jardine
| 
|align=center|3
|align=center|5:00
|Las Vegas, Nevada, United States
|
|-
| Win
|align=center| 13–4
| Rafael Ledezma
| TKO (ankle injury)
| Gladiator Challenge: Full Force
| 
|align=center|1
|align=center|0:09
|San Jacinto, California, United States
|
|-
| Win
|align=center| 12–4
| Koa Ramos
| Submission (heel hook)
| KOTC: Sniper
| 
|align=center|1
|align=center|1:47
|San Bernardino, California, United States
|
|-
| Win
|align=center| 11–4
| Joe Lewis
| Submission (rear-naked choke)
| KOTC: Tropical Storm
| 
|align=center|1
|align=center|4:10
|Lake Elsinore, California, United States
|
|-
| Loss
|align=center| 10–4
| Adam Lynn
| Decision (majority)
| KOTC: Excessive Damage
| 
|align=center|3
|align=center|5:00
|Highland, California, United States
|
|-
| Loss
|align=center| 10–3
| Bobby Green
| TKO (punches)
| KOTC: Arrival
| 
|align=center|1
|align=center|4:27
|Highland, California, United States
|
|-
| Win
|align=center| 10–2
| Eric Moon
| Submission (armbar)
| KOTC: Fight 4 Hope
| 
|align=center|1
|align=center|3:04
|Highland, California, United States
|
|-
| Win
|align=center| 9–2
| Waachiim Spiritwolf
| TKO (punches)
| KOTC: Distorted
| 
|align=center|2
|align=center|2:25
|Highland, California, United States
|
|-
| Win
|align=center| 8–2
| Mike Robles
| TKO (punches)
| KOTC: Militia
| 
|align=center|3
|align=center|2:12
|Highland, California, United States
|
|-
| Win
|align=center| 7–2
| Erik Meaders
| KO (punches)
| KOTC: Storm
| 
|align=center|1
|align=center|2:20
|Lake Elsinore, California, United States
|
|-
| Loss
|align=center| 6–2
| Quinn Mulhern
| Submission (triangle choke)
| KOTC: New Breed
| 
|align=center|2
|align=center|2:52
|Mescalero, New Mexico, United States
|
|-
| Loss
|align=center| 6–1
| Waachiim Spiritwolf
| KO (punch)
| KOTC: Prowler
| 
|align=center|2
|align=center|0:16
|Highland, California, United States
|
|-
| Win
|align=center| 6–0
| James Fanshier
| Decision (unanimous)
| KOTC: Misconduct
| 
|align=center|3
|align=center|5:00
|Highland, California, United States
|
|-
| Win
|align=center| 5–0
| Daniel Hernandez
| Submission (rear-naked choke)
| KOTC: Bio Hazard
| 
|align=center|2
|align=center|2:01
|Highland, California, United States
|
|-
| Win
|align=center| 4–0
| Gabe Lara
| TKO
| KOTC: Tsunami 2
| 
|align=center|1
|align=center|1:09
|Highland, California, United States
|
|-
| Win
|align=center| 3–0
| Fortino Sanchez
| KO (punches)
| KOTC: Premiere
| 
|align=center|1
|align=center|0:56
|Highland, California, United States
|
|-
| Win
|align=center| 2–0
| Napoleon Lechuga
| Submission (armbar)
| KOTC: Final Chapter
| 
|align=center|1
|align=center|3:31
|San Jacinto, California, United States
|
|-
| Win
|align=center| 1–0
| Robert Doucet
| TKO (punches)
| KOTC: Point of No Return
| 
|align=center|1
|align=center|0:46
|San Jacinto, California, United States
|

References

1985 births
Living people
American male mixed martial artists
Mixed martial artists utilizing wrestling
People from Norco, California
Mixed martial artists from California